Tom Nardini (born April 16, 1945) is an American film actor who had a lengthy career in television in which his best known role was in Cowboy in Africa (1967). In film his best known role was in Cat Ballou (1965) for which he was nominated for a Golden Globe award.

Early life 
Born in Los Angeles, California, in 1945 as Thomas Nardini, he was the son of Joseph and Chechi Nardini. Nardini's father worked as an aircraft worker after having a career as a jazz musician and his mother worked in vaudeville as a comedian, dancer, and singer.  He attended Morningside High School in Inglewood, graduating in 1963. Nardini furthered his education by attending El Camino Junior College in Torrance, where he studied theater and joined a Shakespearean group.

Career 
Nardini met an agent named Lester Miller, who was able to get him an interview to audition for Mr. Novak. This led to one of Nardini's first roles appearing in three episodes of Novak as Abel King from 1964 to 1965. This allowed Nardini to land other roles as guest leads on other television shows such as The Lieutenant and My Three Sons and Bewitched. Nardini was then cast for his most notable role in the television series Cowboy in Africa, where he played the character John Henry.

Nardini then signed a seven-year contract with Columbia Studios, which produced his film debut Cat Ballou in 1965. Nardini was cast as Jackson Two Bears, a Native American ranch hand for Cat Ballou's father. Nardini was nominated for Most Promising Newcomer - Male at the 23rd Golden Globe Awards for his performance.

In the films Cat Ballou and Africa: Texas Style, Nardini played a Native American character, which presented the risk of being typecast as a Native American in all his roles.

In 1966, Nardini co-starred in a pilot about a World War II-era historical novel written by James Jones called From Here to Eternity.

Personal life 
Nardini has been married three times, first to Judy K. Cooper during 1966, then Melody Gay Barsocchini from 1970 to 1981 with whom he had one son, and has been married to Ruth Helen Belding, with whom he has two sons, since 1985.

Nardini was in the Air Force reserve in 1966, based in Riverside, California.

Filmography 
 Chief Zabu (2016) .... Gatekeeper
 Kate & Allie (1985) .... (as Tom Nardino)
 Siege (1983) .... Horatio
 T. J. Hooker (1982) .... Falco
 Muggable Mary, Street Cop (1982) (TV) .... Mugger Inside Supermarket
 The Edge of Night (1981) .... Wally Branscom
 Win, Place or Steal (1975) .... Desk Sergeant
 Kung Fu .... Matoska (1 episode, 1974)
 Insight .... Rodriguez / ... (2 episodes, 1974)
 Love, American Style .... (segment "Love and the Test of Manhood") (1 episode, 1972)
 The Smith Family (1 episode, 1971)
 Cade's County .... Tom Running Man (1 episode, 1971)
 Bearcats! .... Father Liberto (1 episode, 1971)
 Cat Ballou (1970) (TV) .... Jackson Two Bears
 Harpy (1971) (TV) .... John
 Incident in San Francisco (1971) (TV) .... Alfred Cianelli
 The Mod Squad (1 episode, 1970)
 Land of the Giants .... Carl (1 episode, 1969)
 Hawaii Five-O .... Ramon (1 episode, 1969)
 Room 222 .... Robert Salazar (1 Season episode 15 El Genio) 1969
 The Devil's 8 (1969) .... Billy Joe
 The Young Animals (1968) .... Tony
 Cowboy in Africa .... John Henry (26 episodes, 1967–1968)
 Cimarron Strip .... John Wolf (1 episode, 1967)
 Africa Texas Style (1967) .... John Henry
 The Fugitive .... Jimmy Anza (1 episode, 1967)
 Gunsmoke .... Richard Danby (1 episode, 1965)
 Dr. Kildare .... Steve Perrona (7 episodes, 1965)
 Bewitched .... Indian (1 episode, 1965)
 Winter A-Go-Go (1965) .... Frankie
 Cat Ballou (1965) .... Jackson Two-Bears
 Death Valley Days .... Steve Avote (1 episode, 1965)
 Mr. Novak .... Abel King / ... (3 episodes, 1964–1965)

References

Bibliography 
 "Tom Nardini To Co-Star With Connors." Pittsburgh Post Gazette [Pittsburgh] 16 Aug. 1967 : 24. Print.
 "Ocala Star-Banner - Google News Archive Search." Ocala Star-Banner - Google News Archive Search. Oscala Star Banner, 3 Sept. 1967. Web. 27 Oct. 2015.
 Gannett News Service. "The Evening News -Google News Archive Search." The Evening News - Google News Archive Search. The Evening News, 25 Nov. 1967. Web. 27 Oct. 2015.
 "Toledo Blade - Google News Archive Search." Toledo Blade - Google News Archive Search. Toledo Blade, 21 Feb. 1968. Web. 27 Oct. 2015.
 TV Scout. "The Times-News - Google News Archive Search." The Times-News - Google News Archive Search. The Times-News, 22 May 1971. Web. 02 Nov. 2015

American male television actors
1945 births
Living people